4022 Nonna, provisional designation , is a Vestian asteroid from the inner regions of the asteroid belt, approximately  kilometers in diameter. It was discovered on 8 October 1981, by Soviet–Russian astronomer Lyudmila Chernykh at the Crimean Astrophysical Observatory. The asteroid was named after Soviet actress Nonna Mordyukova. The nearly fast rotator has an exceptionally low lightcurve-amplitude indicating a nearly spherical shape.

Orbit and classification 

Nonna is a member of the Vesta family. Vestian asteroids have a composition akin to cumulate eucrites (HED meteorites) and are thought to have originated deep within 4 Vesta's crust, possibly from the Rheasilvia crater, a large impact crater on its southern hemisphere near the South pole, formed as a result of a subcatastrophic collision. Vesta is the main belt's second-largest and second-most-massive body after Ceres.

It orbits the Sun in the inner main-belt at a distance of 2.1–2.7 AU once every 3 years and 7 months (1,323 days; semi-major axis of 2.36 AU). Its orbit has an eccentricity of 0.13 and an inclination of 5° with respect to the ecliptic. The asteroid was first observed at Goethe Link Observatory in October 1952.

Physical characteristics 

Nonna has been characterized as a Q- and V-type asteroid by Pan-STARRS photometric survey, while the Collaborative Asteroid Lightcurve Link (CALL) assumes it to be a common S-type asteroid. The overall spectral type of Vestian asteroids is typically that of a V-type.

Rotation period 

Since 2006, several rotational lightcurves of Nonna have been obtained from photometric observations at Modra Observatory by astronomers Adrián Galád and Petr Pravec. Analysis of the best-rated lightcurve from September 2006 gave a rotation period of 2.5877 hours with a brightness variation of 0.077 magnitude. A measurement by French amateur astronomer René Roy gave a similar result of 2.62 hours, after using an alternative period solution. All lightcurves showed an unusually low amplitude which is indicative for a spheroidal shape. The asteroid's short period is close to that of a fast rotator.

Diameter and albedo 

According to the survey carried out by the NEOWISE mission of NASA's Wide-field Infrared Survey Explorer, Nonna measures 3.67 kilometers in diameter and its surface has an exceptionally high albedo of 0.907. Conversely, CALL assumes a standard stony albedo of 0.20 and calculates a much larger diameter of 7.13 kilometers based on an absolute magnitude of 13.1.

Naming 

This minor planet was named after Soviet cinema actress Nonna Mordyukova (1925–2008), a celebrated People's Artist of the USSR. The official naming citation was published by the Minor Planet Center on 25 August 1991.

Notes

References

External links 
 Asteroid Lightcurve Database (LCDB), query form (info )
 Dictionary of Minor Planet Names, Google books
 Asteroids and comets rotation curves, CdR – Observatoire de Genève, Raoul Behrend
 Discovery Circumstances: Numbered Minor Planets (1)-(5000) – Minor Planet Center
 
 

004022
Discoveries by Lyudmila Chernykh
Named minor planets
19811008